The New South Wales Minister for Education and Early Learning is a minister in the New South Wales Government and has responsibilities that includes all schools and institutes of higher education in New South Wales, Australia.

The current Minister for Education and Early Learning is Sarah Mitchell, since 30 January 2017. The minister is supported by the Minister for Skills and Training, presently Alister Henskens, since 21 December 2021.

Together, the ministers administer the portfolio through the Education cluster, in particular the Department of Education, TAFE NSW, and a range of other government agencies.

Ultimately, the ministers are responsible to the Parliament of New South Wales.

Office history
The role of administering the education system in New South Wales began with the passing by the New South Wales Legislative Council of the National Education Board Act 1848, which emulated the 'National' system of education established in Ireland by Lord Stanley in 1831 through the Stanley letter. The Act established the Board of National Education, a body corporate, with a Chairman of the Board appointed by the board members. The Board was abolished by the colonial government of Henry Parkes in 1866 with the passing of the Public Schools Act 1866 and its functions were replaced by the Council of Education.

Originally the bill for the act had included a measure to attach the role of President of the Council of Education ex officio to the Colonial Secretary. This measure was deleted in committee stage and the role of President was to be elected by the members of the council. This came to be seen by the first president, Parkes, as an indispensable way in which to protect the independence of the fledgling education system in the colony. From 1873, with the independence of the role of President well established, the responsibility for education within the Parliament was held by the Minister of Justice and Public Instruction.

However this situation did not last and the independent council was abolished with the passing of the Public Instruction Act 1880 by Sir Henry Parkes' third government. The Act dissolved the Council of Education and transferred its responsibilities to a new Minister of Public Instruction, who had the role of establishing for the first time a well-structured system of public education throughout the colony. The Minister administered the portfolio through the Department of Public Instruction, which became the Department of Education in 1915. In 2015 the functions of TAFE NSW were transferred from the education portfolio to the industry, portfolio only to return to the education portfolio in 2019.

Predecessor offices and ministers

Board of National Education/Council of Education
The Chairman or President were not ministers of the crown, although all but John Smith were current or former members of parliament. They were independent of ministerial supervision until the Minister of Justice and Public Instruction was appointed in December 1873.

Ministers of Justice and Public Instruction

List of ministers
The following individuals have been appointed Minister for Education and Early Childhood Learning or any previous titles.

Ministers for Education

Former ministerial titles

Assistant ministers
Occasionally, an Assistant Minister for Education would be appointed to assist the minister and act as a deputy.

See also 

List of New South Wales government agencies

References

Education
New South Wales